Esther Streit-Wurzel (July 25, 1932, − December 7, 2013) was an Israeli children's author and educator.

Streit-Wurzel was born in Petach Tikva, Central District, in Mandatory Palestine. Her father, Shalom Streit, was an educator who founded Ahad Ha'am Gymnasium in Petach Tikvah. She wrote her first book at age 12, in 1944, under the pen name Zvi Hadas, as she was too shy to credit herself with her work. 
She graduated from the Hebrew University of Jerusalem in 1952, with a degree in literature and psychology. Apart from writing, she was also an educator.

Esther Streit-Wurzel died following a serious illness on 7 December 2013, aged 81, in Petach Tikva, Central District, Israel. Her funeral took place the next day on 8 December and was attended by thousands. She was survived by her husband and three children.

Selected works
 From the Straits, 1962 (מן המצר)
 Baba's Story, 1964 (סיפורה של בבה)
 Happy New Year to Dana, 1969 (שנה טובה לדנה)
 Boys of the Resistance, 1969 (נערי המחתרת)
 The Escape, 1973/09/14 (הבריחה)
 Uri, 1976 (אורי)
 Adventure in Eilat, 1978 (הרפתקה באילת)
 Aliphim (Freshmen), 1982 (אליפים)
 The Hostage, 1987 (בן הערובה)
 Letters to Tzofia, 1987 (מכתבים לצופיה)
 My Son, Daniel, 1989 (בני דניאל)
 Shahar, 1990 (שחר)
 The Australians / Anna, 1990 (אוסטרלים / אנה)
 The Prayer of the Monk, 1994 (תפילת הנזיר)
 Seven Locks ,1995 (שבעת המנעולים)
 Moments of Light, 1998 (רגעי האור)
 Eddie, King of the Stoners, 1998 (אדי מלך המסטולים)
 Friendship, 2003 (חברות)
 Roey, 2004 (רועי)
 Autobiography: From Ori to Eddit: The Tales of My Books, 1999 (אוטוביוגרפיה: מאורי עד אדי: קורות ספרי)
 Atarot, 2006 (עטרות)
 Two Mothers, 2006 (שתי אמהות)
 Orange Summer, 2008 (קיץ כתום)

Books For Toddlers
 The Doll from the Little House, 1964 (הבובה מהבית הקטן)
 Happy New Year to Dana, 1969 (שנה טובה לדנה)
 Chiri Biri from Chiriboom Land, 1991 (צ'ירי בירי מארץ צ'יריבום)

References

1932 births
2013 deaths
People from Petah Tikva
Israeli children's writers
Israeli schoolteachers
Israeli Jews
Hebrew University of Jerusalem alumni
Israeli women children's writers
Burials at Segula Cemetery